Hans Dekkers may refer to:

Hans Dekkers (cyclist, born 1928), Dutch cyclist
Hans Dekkers (cyclist, born 1981), Dutch cyclist who rode for Garmin-Slipstream in 2009